Ding Guanpeng (active 1708–1771) was a Chinese painter who lived during the Qing dynasty.

A native of Beijing, he was active from the later part of the Kangxi era (1661–1722) to the middle part of the Qianlong era (1735–96). At one point he studied oil painting under Giuseppe Castiglione. He was noted for painting people and landscapes. He spent about 50 years in the Palace Painting Academy and drew nearly 200 pieces.

Notes

Qing dynasty painters
Painters from Beijing
18th-century Chinese painters